Fenway Partners is an American private equity firm that makes leveraged buyout and growth capital investments in transportation, logistics, consumer products, and manufacturing companies in the middle market.
In 2002 Fenway acquired the molding equipment and customer base of Premier Tile. The price for the acquisition was 8.25 million.
The firm was founded in 1994 by Richard Dresdale (formerly Clayton, Dubilier & Rice) and Peter Lamm (formerly Butler Capital Partners) and has over $2 billion of capital under management.  Since its inception, the firm has raised three private equity funds.  Fenway's first fund closed on approximately $525 million of capital commitments in 1996 and just two years later, in 1998, the firm raised an additional $900 million of capital.  As a result of several investments made in the 1998 fund, before the collapse of the dot-com bubble, performance in that fund was affected.  Nevertheless, the firm was able to raise a successor fund in 2006 and 2007 with approximately $700 million of commitments from institutional investors.

Investments
Among the firms, the most notable investments are Targus, 1-800 Contacts, Coach America, Riddell, Bell Sports , and Easton.

Targus Corporation

Fenway Partners acquired Targus Group International, an Anaheim, California-based company, for $382.5 million on November 22 of 2005. During the acquisition of Targus, the managing director at Fenway Partners, Timothy Mayhew, was quoted saying; “Targus has many of the elements Fenway looks for, including a leading market position, a diversified revenue base with high barriers to entry, strong free cash flow and dynamic industry characteristics.” Targus was the original creator of carrying cases for portable computers and have since expanded into multiple electronics accessories including; backpacks, locks, keyboards and keypads, privacy screens, to name a few, and most recently with their acquisition of Sena, a high quality leather case maker, into the market of cases for smart phones.

1-800 Contacts

In 2007, Fenway Partners acquired 1-800 Contacts, a vendor and distributor of brand name contact lens, located in Draper, Utah. The price set for the acquisition of 1-800 Contacts was at premium of 21% over the highest reported share value within the last year and 34% over the closing price within the last month. In total, the purchase price was valued at $340 million.

On June 20th of 2012, Co-Founder of Fenway Partners, Peter Lamm, was quoted stating “We are very pleased with the outcome of our investment in 1-800 Contacts” after Fenway Partners sold 1-800 Contacts to WellPoint Inc., a health benefits firm, for approximately $900 million.

Riddell Sports Group

On July 7, 2003, Fenway Partners proudly announced their acquisition of Riddell Sports Group a sporting goods manufacturer.  Riddell helmets are worn by more than 85% of NFL players, and in 2002 they released the first computer engineered football helmet in its efforts to help reduce concussions among athletes.  As the leading manufacturer of football helmets, among other products such as pads and collectible replica items, Riddell posted revenues of over $100 million in 2002, the same figure for which it was acquired by Fenway Partners the following year.

Bell Sports

Bell Sports, a helmet and apparel manufacturer, was acquired by Fenway Partners in August 2004.  Bell was acquired for an estimated $240 million.  The purchase of Bell Sports, whose owner investors had planned to sell the company back in April, was powerful move for Fenway Partners as it planned to merge its newest asset with their recently acquired Riddell Sports Group.

Among the firm's most notable realized investments are high-end jewelry retailer Harry Winston and the Simmons Bedding Company.

Mergers

Riddell Sports Group/Bell Sports

“This is a merger of strengths in a sense” stated Tim Mayhew, managing director for Fenway Partners, who acquired Riddell Sports Group in 2003, and Bell Sports in 2004.  The purchase of Bell was very fitting in expanding Fenway’s market share in the sports industry.  By combining both these industry leaders, Bell from action sports and Riddell from the football industry, the company will now have the largest research and development facility, based in Santa Cruz, California., geared towards head protection in the world.  Combined, these companies will now be producing over 8 million helmets a year and are expected to earn revenues upwards of $300 million in 2004.
CEO and president of Bell Sports, Bill Fry, was appointed to lead the combined companies’ management team due to his efforts in putting Bell back on top of its market since he joined in 2001.  Bill Sherman, Riddell CEO will remain in his current position as well as serving on the board of directors in regards to the company.

Riddell Bell Holdings/Easton Sports Inc.

Two years after the merger of Riddell and Bell, Fenway Partners were at it again by proposing a merger with their newest entity Riddell Bell Holdings and Easton Sports Inc. Easton is a sporting goods industry leader with departments spanning from cycling to baseball, hockey, motocross and even archery. In the past Easton has consistently earned yearly revenues similar to those of Riddell Bell and as a combined entity is expected to break the $600 million mark. Easton Sports Inc. was a subsidiary company of Jas D. Easton and its only subsidiary who was part of the merger. The head of Easton Sports, Jim Easton, was appointed Chair of the new combined entity.  While the Riddel Bell merger earned Fenway a world leader in research and development in their fields, this merger created a behemoth in the sporting goods industry which will be “unsurpassed” stated Bill Sherman CEO of Riddell. Anthony Palma, who served as Easton’s CEO and president until 2008, said about Fenway’s new prized entity; “This company is now the number one baseball company, the number one football company, the number one in bike helmets, number one in snow helmets and the number one hockey innovation company. Yeah, there's a lot of number ones here. We like that."

Miscellaneous
The firm was named loosely about Fenway Park, but the firm is based in New York City and has no connections with the Boston Red Sox, Fenway Park, or Fenway Sports Group.

References

External links
Fenway Partners (company website)

Private equity firms of the United States
Financial services companies based in New York City
Financial services companies established in 1994